The Institute of Petroleum (IP) was a UK-based professional organisation founded in 1913 as the Institute of Petroleum Technologists. It changed its name to the Institute of Petroleum in 1938. The institute became defunct when it merged with the Institute of Energy in 2003 to form the Energy Institute.

Background 
The Institute of Petroleum Technologists was established in 1913 by the consulting chemist and engineer Sir (Thomas) Boverton Redwood (1846–1919) and Arthur Eastlake. At the institute's inaugural meeting in 1914 Sir Thomas stated that the aim of the institute was to determine a “hallmark of proficiency in connection with our profession". He emphasised the need to amalgamate the diverse knowledge and interests of the various branches of the oil industry. In 1938 the institute changed its name to the Institute of Petroleum and membership was opened to all professions associated with the oil and gas industries.

Operation 
The Institute of Petroleum had similar goals to the Energy Institute but was specifically focused on the oil and gas industry, whereas the Energy Institute also covers other forms of energy including nuclear and alternative energies.

The IP designation still survives, for example in the specification of test methods in the petroleum industry. The Energy Institute still runs an "International Petroleum (IP) Week", a series of events and seminars aimed at the petroleum industry.

The institute's crest was an Archaeopteryx with the Latin motto conjunctione potiores (translated as 'preferential coupling').

Publications 
The institute published a monthly magazine Petroleum Review, which the Energy Institute continues to publish.

Scholarly articles were published in the Journal of the Institute of Petroleum from 1939, previously the Journal of the Institute of Petroleum Technologists (Volumes 1 to 24; 1914–1938).

The Petroleum Institute published an extensive range of internationally recognised codes of practice, guidance and petroleum test procedures. The following lists are a sample of the published material.

Codes of safe practice 
Model codes of safe practice (MCSP) included:

 MCSP Part 1: The selection, installation, inspection and maintenance of electrical and non-electrical apparatus in hazardous areas. MCSP 1 Electrical safety code. 7th edition (2003)
 MCSP Part 2 Design, construction and operation of distribution installations  (1998)
 MCSP Part 6, Pipeline Safety Code
 MCSP Part 9 Liquefied petroleum gas. Volume 1: Large bulk pressure storage and refrigerated LPG (1987)
 MCSP Part 11 Bitumen safety code. 3rd edition (1990)
 MCSP Part 15: Area classification for installations handling flammable fluids
 MCSP Part 16: Guidance on tank cleaning
 MCSP Part 19: Fire precautions at petroleum refineries and bulk storage installations
 MCSP Part 21 Guidelines for the control of hazards arising from static electricity. 2nd edition (2002)
 Code of safe practice for contractors working on petrol filling stations (1997)
 Code of safe practice for retailers managing contractors working on petrol filling stations (1999)

General 

 Air quality and its association with human health effects (2001)
 Electrical installation of facilities for the storage and dispensing of LPG and CNG automotive fuels at vehicle refuelling stations (2003)

Guidelines 

 Guidance document on risk assessment for the water environment at operational fuel storage and dispensing facilities (1999)
 Guidance on external cathodic protection of underground steel storage tanks and steel pipework at petrol filling stations (2002)
 Guidelines for investigation and remediation of petroleum retail sites (1998)
 Guidelines for soil, groundwater and surface water protection and vapour emission control at petrol filling stations (2003)

Test methods 
This list is a sample of the test methods available. Note that the IP designation still exists in the specification of these test methods.

 IP 2: Petroleum products and hydrocarbon solvents - Determination of aniline point and mixed aniline point
 IP 4: Petroleum products - Determination of ash (ISO 6245:2001)
 IP 10: Determination of kerosine burning characteristics - 24 hour method
 IP 12: Determination of specific energy
 IP 13: Petroleum products - Determination of carbon residue - Conradson method
 IP 14: Petroleum products - Determination of carbon residue - Ramsbottom method
 IP 16: Determination of the freezing point of aviation fuels — Manual method
 IP 17: Determination of colour — Lovibond® tintometer® method
 IP 30: Detection of mercaptans, hydrogen sulfide, elemental sulfur and peroxides - Doctor test method
 IP 34: Determination of flash point — Pensky-Martens closed cup method
 IP 36: Determination of flash and fire points - Cleveland open cup method
 IP 334: Determination of load carrying capacity of lubricants - FZG gear machine method
 IP 628: Determination of the Solvent Yellow 124 content of kerosine and gas oil – HPLC Method

See also 

 American Petroleum Institute
 Oil and gas industry in the United Kingdom
 Oil terminals in the United Kingdom
 Petroleum refining in the United Kingdom

References

Defunct professional associations based in the United Kingdom
History of the petroleum industry in the United Kingdom
Organisations based in the City of Westminster
Petroleum organizations